Monongalia County is a former county in the U.S. state of Minnesota. It was identified in 1858, although the Dakota War of 1862 delayed its organization until 1861. It was named after Monongalia County, Virginia (now Monongalia County, West Virginia) after residents moved from Virginia to Minnesota. The county seat was at New London, after a brief stay at Columbia.

In 1870 the state legislature ordered it merged with Kandiyohi County, its southern neighbor. Neither county had been able up till then to raise enough money to build a courthouse. In February 1871, they finally agreed to make Willmar the new county seat, succeeding to Kandiyohi Station.

External links
 History of Kandiyohi County Courthouse

Former counties of Minnesota
Kandiyohi County, Minnesota